Project CARS 3 is a racing video game developed by Codemasters subsidiary Slightly Mad Studios and published by Bandai Namco Entertainment. It was first released on 28 August 2020 for PlayStation 4, Windows, and Xbox One. The game was poorly received by the public, being criticized for a departure from its features compared to its predecessors. It is the last title in the Project CARS series as the development for the fourth installment was cancelled by Slightly Mad's owner, Electronic Arts in November 2022.

Gameplay
Project CARS 3 introduces more customizable cars that are available to race over 140 global circuits. The game also features 24-hour cycles, various seasons, and weather effects. The career mode has been rebuilt, with the artificial intelligence being enhanced. The game also support VR on PC. According to CEO of Slightly Mad Studios Ian Bell, the game is a spiritual successor to the Need for Speed: Shift series, which was also developed by Slightly Mad Studios. Having been acquired by British video game developer and publisher Codemasters, which is known for the Formula One series, Colin McRae Rally series and the Dirt series, in November 2019, Project CARS 3 is expected to share some elements from Codemasters' similar genre video game series TOCA, or Grid. The game received its first game trailer on 3 June 2020. The game also features a refined multiplayer mode.

Unlike its predecessors, this game does not feature tyre wear or fuel depletion, and as such, there are no pit stops. This has prompted heavy criticism from fans of the series.

Development and release
Project CARS 3 is still developed by Slightly Mad Studios and published by Bandai Namco Entertainment. The development began in the fall of 2018 after the commercial success of Project CARS 2. Instead of switching to parent company Codemasters's Ego engine, the game is still powered by the same engine as its predecessors. The game was released on PlayStation 4, Windows, and Xbox One on 28 August 2020.

New content includes cars such as the Audi TTS, Koenigsegg Jesko, Lotus Evija and the Bugatti Chiron, plus circuits such as Autódromo José Carlos Pace, Circuito de Jerez and Tuscany.

Reception

Project CARS 3 received "mixed or average" reviews from critics, according to review aggregator Metacritic.

IGN's Luke Reilly said that: "Project CARS 3 is a racer so fundamentally different from its immediate forerunners it’s bordering on unrecognisable. It abandons the sim racing sensibilities and adopts a radically different driving feel and a new career mode mostly made up of snack-sized racing and driving challenges. There’s never a time when it feels like an actual sequel to Project CARS 2 – and that is disappointing."

Jacob Hull from Push Square gave a score of 6/10, claiming: "Project CARS 3 marks a significant departure for the series, abandoning most of its sim heritage in favour of arcade racing. Offering a variety of different cars and tracks, there’s plenty of content on offer, making for a fun distraction, but it lacks the excitement we expect from wheel-to-wheel racing. It takes inspiration from all over the place, but it’s perhaps most closely aligned with Sony’s own DriveClub. It would seem, then, that the PS4 cycle is ending the way it began. We’re just not sure we’d pick this over what’s come before."

The PlayStation Official Magazine UK said it was a "patchy, unbalanced, and shallow racer with obvious technical issues". GameSpot criticised the AI, but said it had "a more arcade style of racing is one that makes the series approachable for the first time."

Sales 
The game reached number 5 in the US physical sales chart, and 17 in the UK, selling 86% less than the previous game. The PlayStation 4 version of Project CARS 3 sold 2,404 copies within its first week on sale in Japan, making it the twenty-fourth bestselling retail game of the week in the country.

Awards

References

External links
 
	 

2020 video games
Bandai Namco games
Codemasters games
Formula One video games
Multiplayer and single-player video games
PlayStation 4 games
PlayStation 4 Pro enhanced games
Project CARS
Video game sequels
Slightly Mad Studios games
Video games set in Australia
Video games set in Bahrain
Video games set in California
Video games set in China
Video games set in Colorado
Video games set in Cuba
Video games set in the Czech Republic
Video games set in Daytona Beach, Florida
Video games set in Dubai
Video games set in England
Video games set in France
Video games set in Germany
Video games set in Japan
Video games set in Indianapolis
Video games set in Italy
Video games set in Monaco
Video games set in New York (state)
Video games set in New Zealand
Video games set in the Netherlands
Video games set in Portugal
Video games set in São Paulo
Video games set in Scotland
Video games set in Shanghai
Video games set in Spain
Video games set in South Africa
Video games set in Texas
Video games set in Utah
Video games set in Wisconsin
Video games set in the United Arab Emirates
Video games set in the United Kingdom
Video games set in the United States
Windows games
Xbox One games
Video games developed in the United Kingdom